The Tambopata River is a river in southeastern Peru and northwestern Bolivia. Most is in the Madre de Dios and Puno regions in Peru, but the upper parts of the river forms the border between Peru and Bolivia, and its origin is in La Paz department in Bolivia. The Tambopata River is a tributary of the Madre de Dios River and merges into this river at the city of Puerto Maldonado. The river flows through the Tambopata National Reserve.

Seven types of flooded forest are recognized for this Reserve:
 Permanently waterlogged swamp forests are former oxbow lakes still flooded but covered in forest.
 Seasonally waterlogged swamp forests are oxbow lakes in the process of filling in.
 Lower floodplain forest are the lowest floodplain locations with a recognizable forest.
 Middle floodplain forests are tall occasionally flooded forests.
 Upper floodplain forests are tall rarely flooded forests.
 Old floodplain forests have been subjected to flooding within the last two hundred years.
 Previous floodplain are now terra firme, but were historically ancient floodplains.

References

Rivers of Peru
Rivers of La Paz Department (Bolivia)
Rivers of Madre de Dios Region
Rivers of Puno Region